Shangganling may refer to:

 Sanggamnyong, or Shangganling in Chinese, a hamlet in North Korea and the site of Battle of Shangganling in 1952
 Shangganling (film),  1956 Chinese war film
 Shangganling District, district of Yichun, Heilongjiang, China